The Freedom Party was a political party in the United Kingdom, active between 2000 and 2006.

History 
The party was founded in December 2000 by former members of the British National Party (BNP), dubbed "ultra-Tories" by BNP leader Nick Griffin, who were disaffected with the party's refusal to moderate its position on race. They were expelled following a feud with the BNP leadership and allegations of financial irregularities and misconduct. Most prominent were two party activists in the West Midlands, husband and wife Steve Edwards (who became Freedom Party agent) and Sharron Edwards (formerly deputy chairman of the BNP and then deputy chairman of the Freedom Party). Adrian Davies was Party Chairman and Michael Newland was the  treasurer. Most of the leadership were prominent in the Bloomsbury Forum, a right-wing discussion group.

The party was primarily anti-immigration, although it claimed to place more of an emphasis on culture rather than race.  It was more mainstream on issues such as race than the British National Party, with which it had a stormy relationship. The party aimed to appeal to 'reasonable people'. It believed in a Keynesian approach to the economy, and was also protectionist.

In 2004 the Freedom Party was involved in founding the English Lobby, a pressure group and electoral coalition which campaigns for the recognition of St George's Day and the creation of an English Parliament. The Freedom Party has since withdrawn from the Lobby.

The Freedom Party first stood in 2001 for Staffordshire County Council in Wombourne South West. In May 2003, Sharron Edwards was elected in that ward with 640 votes (40.54%), holding her seat until 2007. The party's only candidate in the 2005 general election was Adrian Davies, who contested South Staffordshire. The death of a candidate led to the election there being postponed from May 5 to June 23. The Freedom Party polled 473 votes (1.7%).

The party was dissolved in 2006. In 2013 Davies wrote the party constitution and registered the party name of the British Democratic Party, founded by then-MEP Andrew Brons following his narrow defeat to Nick Griffin in the 2011 British National Party leadership election.

References

Political parties established in 2000
Defunct political parties in England
2000 establishments in the United Kingdom
Political parties disestablished in 2006
2006 disestablishments in the United Kingdom